The 1941 Soviet Top League was cancelled due to World War II. The last matches were played on June 24.

League standings as of June 24, 1941

 CDKA were renamed to Red Army (now CSKA)
 Out of Moscovite Lokomotiv, Torpedo, Metallurg, and Krylya Sovetov were formed teams Profsoyuzy-1 and Profsoyuzy-2.
 Out of Leningradis Avangard, Zenit, and Krasnaya Zaria were formed teams Profsoyuz of Leningrad which was renamed again into Zenit.
 As the Group B liquidated for the 1941 season FC Dinamo Minsk, FC Spartak Odessa, and FC Spartak Kharkiv were promoted along with SC Spartak Leningrad. Presumably FC Spartak Kharkiv was also a merger of Dynamo, and Silmash forming the reformed united city team Spartak, but evidence of that is yet to be found.

Results

Top scorers
8 goals
 Viktor Matveyev (Traktor Stalingrad)
 Aleksei Sokolov (Spartak Moscow)

7 goals
 Sergei Solovyov (Dynamo Moscow)

6 goals
 Boris Paichadze (Dinamo Tbilisi)
 Viktor Panyukov (Dinamo Tbilisi)
 Pyotr Shcherbakov (Spartak Odessa)

5 goals
 Aleksandr Fyodorov (Dynamo Leningrad)
 Mikhail Semichastny (Dynamo Moscow)

4 goals
 Ilya Bizyukov (Dynamo Leningrad)
 Pavel Kornilov (Spartak Moscow)
 Ivan Mitronov (Profsoyuzy-2 Moscow)
 Konstantin Sazonov (Dynamo Leningrad)

References

 Soviet Union - List of final tables (RSSSF)

1941
1
Soviet
Soviet